Mohamed Ismaïl (1 September 1951 – 20 March 2021) was a Moroccan film director. He directed the 2008 film Goodbye Mothers.

References

Moroccan film directors
1951 births
2021 deaths